The 2017–18 Belmont Bruins men's basketball team represented Belmont University during the 2017–18 NCAA Division I men's basketball season. The Bruins, led by 32nd-year head coach Rick Byrd, played their home games at the Curb Event Center in Nashville, Tennessee as members of the Ohio Valley Conference. They finished the season 24–9, 15–3 in OVC play to finish in second place. They defeated Austin Peay in the semifinals of the OVC tournament to advance to the championship game where they lost to Murray State. Despite having 24 wins, they did not participate in a postseason tournament.

Previous season
The Bruins finished the 2016–17 season 23–7, 15–1 in OVC play to win the regular season championship. In the OVC tournament, they lost in the semifinals to Jacksonville State. As a regular season conference champion who failed to win their conference tournament title, they received an automatic bid to the National Invitation Tournament. There they defeated Georgia in the first round before losing to Georgia Tech.

Preseason 
In a vote of Ohio Valley Conference head men's basketball coaches and sports information directors, Belmont was picked to win the OVC for the third consecutive year. Senior forward Amanze Egekeze and senior guard Austin Luke were named to the preseason All-OVC team.

After five years of divisional play in the OVC, the conference eliminated divisions for the 2017–18 season. Additionally, for the first time, each conference team will play 18 conference games.

Roster

Schedule and results

|-
!colspan=9 style=| Exhibition

|-
!colspan=9 style=| Regular season

|-
!colspan=9 style=| Ohio Valley regular season

|-
!colspan=9 style="|Ohio Valley Conference tournament

Source

References

Belmont Bruins men's basketball seasons
Belmont